The UPU S10 standard defines a system for assigning 13-character identifiers to international postal items for the purpose of tracking and tracing them during shipping.

With increased liberalization and the possibility of multiple postal services operating in the same country, the use of country codes to designate the postal service is a problem. To solve this, each country has a designated postal service that controls all S10 identifiers from that country; any competing postal services will have to cooperate with the designated owner. The organization assigned by the UPU member country shall manage the issue and use of S10 identifiers, among all the operators under the authority of that UPU member country, in such a way as to ensure that no S10 identifier is reused within a period of 12 calendar months. A period of 24 calendar months, or longer, is recommended.

Format
The identifiers consist of a two letter service indicator code, an eight digit serial number (in the range 00000000 to 99999999), a single check-digit, and a two-letter ISO country code—the latter identifying the issuing postal administration's country.

Service indicator codes

Service codes are generally assigned and administered within each issuing country, but certain types of service and code ranges are used for all countries as listed here.

Check-digit calculation
 Ignore the Service Indicator Code and Country Code
 Assign the weights 8, 6, 4, 2, 3, 5, 9, 7 to the 8 digits, from left to right
 Calculate S, the sum of each digit multiplied by its weight. 
For example, for the number 47312482, S = 4*8 + 7*6 + 3*4 + 1*2 + 2*3 + 4*5 + 8*9 + 2*7 = 200
 Calculate the check digit, C, from C = 11 - (S mod 11)
 If C = 10, change to C = 0
 If C = 11, change to C = 5
 For the example 47312482 C = 11 - (200 mod 11) = 11 - 2 = 9.

Python code for check-digit calculation
For Python 3.6 or later:
def get_check_digit(num: int) -> int:
    """Get S10 check digit."""
    weights = [8, 6, 4, 2, 3, 5, 9, 7]
    sum = 0
    for i, digit in enumerate(f"{num:08}"):
        sum += weights[i] * int(digit)
    sum = 11 - (sum % 11)
    if sum == 10:
        sum = 0
    elif sum == 11:
        sum = 5
    return sum

JavaScript code for check-digit calculation
function getCheckDigit(num) {
    const weights = [8, 6, 4, 2, 3, 5, 9, 7];
    const numArr = Array.from(String(num), Number);
    let sum = 0;
    numArr.forEach((n, i) => sum = sum + (n * weights[i]));
    sum = 11 - (sum % 11);
    if (sum == 10) sum = 0;
    else if (sum == 11) sum = 5;
    return sum;
}

Haskell code for check-digit calculation
checkDigit :: [Int] -> Int
checkDigit ns
    | c == 11 = 5
    | c == 10 = 0
    | otherwise = c
    where weights = [8, 6, 4, 2, 3, 5, 9, 7]
          s = sum $ zipWith (*) weights ns
          c = 11 - (s `mod` 11)

See also
 Serial Shipping Container Code, a related standard.

References

External links
 Draft of S10:
 Part A: Identifier structures and encoding principles
 Part B: EMS items
 Part C: Special letter products
 Part D: Parcels
 Part E: Domestic / bilateral use
 The UPU service indicator code list, list 124
 Online validator for S10 tracking numbers

Identifiers
Universal Postal Union